Drasteria caucasica is a moth of the family Erebidae. It is found in Romania, north-eastern Bulgaria, southern Moldova, southern Ukraine, Russia, Kazakhstan, Turkey, Daghestan, Armenia, Iraq, Iran, Turkmenistan, Uzbekistan, Tadjikistan, Afghanistan, Pakistan, Kyrghyzstan, China (Xinjiang, Tibet) and Mongolia.

The wingspan is 29–32 mm. Adults are on wing from May to August.

The larvae feed on Eleagnus, Hippophae (including Hippophae rhamnoides) and Paliurus species.

References

Drasteria
Moths described in 1848
Moths of Europe
Moths of Asia